A Room To Die For, aka Rancour,  is a 2017 British thriller horror film directed by Devanand Shanmugam and written by Matthew J. Gunn. A Room To Die For was made by Champagne Charlie Productions in 2015 and distributed by 4 Digital Media and Sony Pictures Home Entertainment on 16 January 2017. The film stars Ves Blackwood, Michael Lieber, Jon Campling, Christopher Craig, Loren Peta, Antonia Davies and Ben Ellis.

Plot  
A struggling unstable stand-up Comedian Marcus Crowe (Michael Lieber) and his girlfriend Jill Scott (Loren Pete) move into a vacant bedroom in an elderly couples house, Henry and Josephine Baker (Christopher Craig and Antonia Davies) in a quiet suburb of Oxfordshire in an effort to save money, as the story progresses and friction begins to build between a high tempered Henry and a stir-crazy Marcus it becomes ever more apparent that a sinister intention is drawing ever closer for the young couple, as the sweet idyllic country home in bombarded by intimidating police man, unwanted phone calls and mysterious trams, Marcus and Jill have completely disappeared from the room without a trace.

Cast 
Michael Lieber as Mark Crowe
Vas Blackwood as Detective McQueen
Jon Campling as Gary the Tramp
Loren Peta as Jill Scott
Christopher Craig as Henry Baker
Antonia Davies as Josephine Baker
Frederik von Lüttichau as Detective Teller
Ben Ellis as Jason Scott
Natalie Ann Parry as Chloe
Topher Cox as Ben
Jonny Pert as Dead Boy

Production

Casting 

Castings were held in 2014 by Devanand Shanmugam (Director) Matthew J. Gunn (Script Writer) and Topher Cox (Producer) in Oxford England. The first to be secured was Michael Lieber to play the lead role of Mark Crowe he mentions this in a press interview for the Gulf News on 9 July 2014, Christopher Craig and Antonia Davies were cast shortly after to play Henry and Josephine Baker, the auditioning of the psychologically intense role of Jill Scott proved difficult and was recast several times before finally settling on Loren Peta, minor roles and cameo appearance were resolved over the rehearsal period (Jon Campling as Gary the Tramp, Vas Blackwood as Detective McQueen and Ben Ellis as Jill's brother Jason Scott).

Filming 
Filming took place inside an old country house in suburban Oxfordshire England which was a converted Christian church, other locations included a specially design basement in the back garden of the property

Reception 
The film received mixed reviews from critic, gbhbl.com called A Room to Die For "one big mess of tired ideas".

References

External links 
 A Room To Die For | Rotten Tomatoes
 A Room To Die For | IMDB Page
 A Room To Die For | British Board of Film Classification
 A Room To Die For | Facebook Page
 A Room To Die For | Allmovie

2017 films
2017 horror films
British horror thriller films
2010s English-language films
2010s British films